Food Standards Scotland is a non-ministerial government department of the Scottish Government. It is responsible for food safety, food standards, nutrition, food labelling and meat inspection in Scotland. Established by the Food (Scotland) Act 2015, Food Standards Scotland has taken over the responsibilities of the UK-wide organisation, the Food Standards Agency, in Scotland.

Duties 
The key areas of responsibility outlined in the Act include:
 making sure food in Scotland remains safe to eat
 providing advice around improving diet and nutrition for people in Scotland
 providing regulation effectively and proportionately
 supporting the food and drink industry in Scotland, including its reputation
 supporting food and drink policy in Scotland

As well as replacing the duties of the Food Standards Agency in Scotland, Food Standards Scotland has a role in diet and nutrition policy. It also has powers to be able to seize food where labelling rules have not been met.

FSS has a consumer protection role: making sure that food is safe to eat, ensuring consumers know what they are eating and improving nutrition. FSS has a vision of a food and drink environment in Scotland that benefits, protects and is trusted by consumers.

FSS has a role in providing information and advice on food safety and standards, nutrition and labelling. The information provided is intended to be independent, consistent, evidence-based and consumer-focused.

FSS develops policies, provides policy and consumer advice and delivers a robust regulatory and enforcement strategy. FSS is funded mainly by government and charges fees to recover costs for regulatory functions.

Governance
The FSS Board meets in public. Policy recommendations and decisions, and the reasons for them, will be publicly available via the website.

Background
In 2010, the UK Government decided to move responsibility for nutrition and food labelling and standards in England from the Food Standards Agency (FSA) to the Department of Health and the Department for Environment, Food and Rural Affairs (Defra).

Following this the Scottish Government commissioned an independent review to assess the feasibility of establishing a stand-alone Scottish food standards body. The review was led by Professor Jim Scudamore and reported in 2012.

Transition
Having been established by legislation in January 2015, Food Standards Scotland was launched on 1 April 2015.

In advance of the legislation being finalised the FSA in Scotland moved their office to The Pilgrim House, in the centre of Aberdeen.

In November 2014, it was announced that Ross Finnie would be appointed as the Chair of Food Standards Scotland. Geoff Ogle who had been Acting Director for the Scottish branch of Food Standards Agency since June 2014 became the new organisation's Chief Executive.

Passage of the Bill
Plans to create a new food standards body in Scotland were announced by Ministers in June 2012. A public consultation ran between February and May 2013. The Bill passed Stage 2 on the legislative process in November 2014.

The Bill was introduced to Scottish Parliament on 13 March 2014. The Bill passed Stage 2 of the legislative process on 11 November 2014. In August 2014, support for the new body was given by MSPs on the Health and Sport Committee. It received Royal assent on 13 January 2015.

References

External links
 

2015 establishments in Scotland
British food and drink organisations
Food policy in the United Kingdom
Food safety organizations
Food safety in the United Kingdom
Non-ministerial departments of the Scottish Government
Regulators of Scotland